Ed Langdon (born 1 February 1996) is an Australian rules footballer who currently plays for the Melbourne Football Club in the Australian Football League (AFL).

Early life
Langdon participated in the Auskick program at Glen Iris, Victoria. He played his junior football with the Sandringham Dragons in the TAC Cup.

AFL career
Originally recruited by the Fremantle Football Club as the club's 3rd, and the 54th overall draft pick in the 2014 AFL draft, he made his debut in Round 22 of the 2015 AFL season against Melbourne at Domain Stadium, after playing well for Fremantle's reserves team, Peel Thunder, in the West Australian Football League (WAFL). After 5 seasons and 68 games, Langdon was traded to Melbourne at the conclusion of the 2019 season.

Personal life
Langdon's older brother Tom, also played in the AFL for the Collingwood Football Club, before announcing his retirement in November 2020.

Statistics
Updated to the end of the 2022 season.

|-
| 2015 ||  || 26
| 2 || 0 || 2 || 20 || 12 || 32 || 12 || 5 || 0.0 || 1.0 || 10.0 || 6.0 || 16.0 || 6.0 || 2.5 || 0
|- 
| 2016 ||  || 26
| 13 || 8 || 5 || 100 || 105 || 205 || 34 || 35 || 0.6 || 0.4 || 7.7 || 8.1 || 15.8 || 2.6 || 2.7 || 0
|-
| 2017 ||  || 26
| 10 || 5 || 3 || 98 || 81 || 179 || 42 || 19 || 0.5 || 0.3 || 9.8 || 8.1 || 17.9 || 4.2 || 1.9 || 0
|- 
| 2018 ||  || 26
| 21 || 11 || 11 || 279 || 191 || 470 || 121 || 61 || 0.5 || 0.5 || 13.3 || 9.1 || 22.4 || 5.8 || 2.9 || 0
|-
| 2019 ||  || 26
| 22 || 9 || 10 || 320 || 230 || 550 || 131 || 42 || 0.4 || 0.5 || 14.5 || 10.5 || 25.0 || 6.0 || 1.9 || 2
|- 
| 2020 ||  || 15
| 17 || 2 || 8 || 216 || 125 || 341 || 88 || 22 || 0.1 || 0.5 || 12.7 || 7.4 || 20.1 || 5.2 || 1.3 || 0
|-
| scope=row bgcolor=F0E68C | 2021# ||  || 15
| 24 || 13 || 9 || 315 || 209 || 524 || 130 || 45 || 0.5 || 0.4 || 13.1 || 8.7 || 21.8 || 5.4 || 1.9 || 0
|- 
| 2022 ||  || 15
| 23 || 13 || 7 || 286 || 206 || 492 || 95 || 30 || 0.6 || 0.3 || 12.4 || 9.0 || 21.4 || 4.1 || 1.3 || 7
|- class=sortbottom
! colspan=3 | Career
! 132 !! 61 !! 55 !! 1634 !! 1159 !! 2793 !! 653 !! 259 !! 0.5 !! 0.4 !! 12.4 !! 8.8 !! 21.2 !! 4.9 !! 2.0 !! 9
|}

Notes

Honours and achievements
Team
 AFL premiership player: 2021
 McClelland Trophy: 2021
 WAFL premiership player (Peel Thunder): 2016

Individual
 22under22 team: 2018
 Fremantle Players' Award: 2018

References

External links

1996 births
Living people
Fremantle Football Club players
Peel Thunder Football Club players
Australian rules footballers from Victoria (Australia)
Sandringham Dragons players
People educated at Melbourne Grammar School
Melbourne Football Club players
Melbourne Football Club Premiership players
One-time VFL/AFL Premiership players